The 2018 IPSC Shotgun World Shoot III was the third IPSC Shotgun World Shoot, and was held at the National Shooting Center in Châteauroux, France between 3. and 10. June 2018.

Champions

Open 
The Open division had the second largest match participation with 212 out of 656 starting competitors (37.5%).

Individual

Teams Open

Standard 
The Standard division had the largest match participation with 223 out of 656 starting competitors (39.5%).

Individual

Teams Standard

Standard Manual 
The Standard Manual division had the third largest match participation with 127 out of 656 starting competitors (22.5%).

Individual

Teams Standard Manual

Modified 
The Modified division had the fourth largest match participation with 94 out of 656 starting competitors (16.6%). The division saw Teemu Rintala put on a dominating performance winning with a margin of over 150 points and pushing the nearest competitor Sami Hautamäki in second place down to a Match Percent of 91.83%.

Individual

Teams Modified

Medal table (individual)

Shoot-Off side event 
The shoot-off side event was an audience friendly one-against-one elimination cup held on 10 June, the day after the Main Match was finished. The top overall finishing athletes from the Main Match as well as the top category athletes within in each division were eligible for qualification.

The final in the Open division shoot-off came down to an extremely small margin, with the contenders firing each of their shots almost simultaneously. The decisive hit on the last popper came down to tactics. U.S. shooter Scott Greene had chosen the most aggressive choke, which increased his risk of missing, but ultimately caused his plate to fall down faster.

See also 
IPSC Handgun World Shoots
IPSC Rifle World Shoots
IPSC Action Air World Shoot

References

External links 
 Presentation of the 2017 Handgun World Shoot and the 2018 Shotgun World Shoot in Châteauroux (French with English subtitles)

2018
IPSC Shotgun World Shoot
Shooting competitions in France
International sports competitions hosted by France